Pamilya Ko is a 2019 Philippine drama television series broadcast by ABS-CBN. The series premiered on the network's Primetime Bida evening block and worldwide via The Filipino Channel from September 9, 2019 to March 13, 2020, replacing Minute to Win It: Last Tandem Standing.

Series overview

Episodes

Season 1

Season 2

References

Lists of Philippine drama television series episodes